The 65th Filipino Academy of Movie Arts and Sciences is the annual honors given by the Filipino Academy of Movie Arts and Sciences (FAMAS), an organization composed of prize-winning writers and movie columnists, for achievements in the Philippine cinema for a past year. The awards Night was held at Philippine Social Science Center Auditorium, Quezon City.  on December 28, 2017.

Star Cinema's Barcelona: A Love Untold is the biggest winner with four awards, including Best Picture, Best Director for Olivia Lamasan, Best Actor for Daniel Padilla, and Best Production Design for Shari Marie Montiague. Coming in close with at least two awards is The Unmarried Wife, also by Star Cinema. It took home the Best Actress Award for Angelica Panganiban and Best Screenplay for Vanessa Valdez.

Awards

Major Awards
Winners are listed first and highlighted with boldface.

Special Awards
German Moreno Youth Achievement Award
 Maine Mendoza 
 Ivan Dorschner 

FAMAS Lifetime Achievement Award
  Susan Roces
 Amalia Fuentes

Fernando Poe Jr. Memorial Award
 Dingdong Dantes

Dr. Jose Perez Memorial Award
 Dolly Ann Carvajal

Arturo M. Padua Memorial Award
 Ronald King Constantino

Outstanding Producer
 Donna Sanchez

Outstanding Wellness Organic Producer 
 Lite Premium Healthy Drinks

References

External links
FAMAS Awards 

FAMAS Award
FAM
FAM